Uzhhorod International Airport,  is an international airport located in the city of Uzhhorod, in the western Ukrainian province of Zakarpattia. The airport is situated in the westernmost part of the city, in the Chervenytsia district at 145, Sobranetska Street. It is a small airport, serving Uzhhorod and the whole oblast. The airport's runway begins 90 meters from the Ukrainian-Slovak international border, so planes must use Slovak airspace for some take-offs and landings under special treaty.

History
The airport was not operational from 2016 (except for several months in 2019 when Motor Sich Airlines tried to operate flights) until June 2021. At the end of 2018, the airport received a certificate from the European Aviation Safety Agency (EASA). On 15 March 2019, the airport resumed servicing regular flights. On 24 September 2020, Slovakia and Ukraine signed an agreement on the above-mentioned special treaty. Windrose Airlines performed the first regular flight on the route Kyiv - Uzhhorod on 2 June 2021. 

On 9 September 2021 the airport became fully operational. Until then, flights were carried out according to the so-called visual flight rules. All civilian flights were stopped during the Russian invasion of 2022. If Russia was to target the airport using missiles with bad precision, a missile could accidentally land on Slovak territory, meaning that Russia would be bombing an EU and NATO member. 

On 24 February 2022, Ukraine closed airspace to civilian flights due to Russian invasion of Ukraine.

Airlines and destinations
The following airlines operate regular scheduled and charter services to and from Uzhhorod International Airport. 

As of 24 February 2022, all passenger flights have been suspended indefinitely.

Statistics

See also
 List of airports in Ukraine
 List of the busiest airports in Ukraine
 List of the busiest airports in Europe
 List of the busiest airports in the former USSR

References

External links

Airports in Ukraine
Airports built in the Soviet Union
Airport
Slovakia–Ukraine border
Czechoslovakia–Soviet Union relations
Transport in Uzhhorod